John C. Diebel (born 1943) is the founder of telescope manufacturer Meade Instruments and a recipient of the Franklin Institute's Bower Award For Business Leadership.

Meade Instruments
Soon after receiving a doctorate in electronic engineering from the California Institute of Technology, Diebel landed an engineering job at Hughes Aircraft. It was there that he realized that he wanted to start his own business, and after doing some research in a public library, he concluded that he would start a small mail-order business selling products for amateur astronomy.

In 1972, after procuring a loan of $2500, Diebel made his first purchase from a telescope supplier in Japan and placed an ad in Sky & Telescope magazine. Eventually, Diebel was able to quit his job at Hughes and work on his mail-order business from his one-bedroom apartment full-time. He named his company Mead, but eventually added the "e" at the suggestion of a co-worker at Hughes. Meade Instruments would eventually become the world's largest telescope manufacturer for amateur astronomy, with distribution in over thirty countries.

Diebel received the Franklin Institute's Bower Award for Business Leadership in 1998 and retired from Meade Instruments in 2003. The asteroid 15276 Diebel was named in honor of Diebel.

References

1943 births
American businesspeople
Living people
Meade Instruments